Broadbottom railway station serves the village of Broadbottom in Greater Manchester, England. It was opened by the Sheffield, Ashton-Under-Lyne and Manchester Railway in 1842. It was renamed Mottram in 1845, but has since reverted to its original name.

East of the station is Broadbottom Viaduct which carries the line  over the River Etherow.

Services 

There is a generally half-hourly daily service each way, with weekday peak extras, between Manchester Piccadilly, Glossop and Hadfield. 
Trains operate hourly in the evenings in each direction. Early morning, rush hour and late evening services start or terminate at Glossop.

History
The station is situated between mileposts  and 10 and has had various names over time. The Sheffield, Ashton-under-Lyne & Manchester Railway called it Broadbottom when it opened on 10 December 1842. In July 1845, the name became Mottram. The MS&L later decided on the best of both worlds when they renamed the station Mottram and Broadbottom on 1 May 1884. From 1 August 1897, the MS&LR became the Great Central Railway (GCR) and this was merged with other companies to form the London and North Eastern Railway (LNER) on 1 January 1923. Modern officials were not happy with such duplicity and the station reverted to its original title on 1 January 1954. Something of the former legend, though, was applied with the suffix for Mottram and Charlesworth remaining in use until comparatively recently.

Goods facilities here ceased on 15 July 1963, but the station remains open to passengers today. Never catering for more than local traffic, the station did have a moment of glory for a short period in the 1920s, when the LNER's morning restaurant car express from Manchester London Road to London Marylebone called here.

The wooden shelter is expected to be removed in March 2021.

Facilities
The station has retained its ticket office, which is staffed six days per week (Mondays to Fridays 06:15 - 13:25, Saturdays 06:40 - 14:00, closed Sundays).  Outside these times, tickets must be purchased prior to travel or on board the train.  There is also a waiting room in the main building and a shelter on the Glossop-bound platform; the remaining buildings on the westbound side are now in private ownership.  Train running details can be obtained via timetable posters, digital CIS displays and telephone.  Level access is available only from the car park to platform 1, as both access routes to the opposite side require the use of steps.

References

External links 

Railway stations in Tameside
DfT Category E stations
Former Great Central Railway stations
Railway stations in Great Britain opened in 1842
Northern franchise railway stations
Woodhead Line
1842 establishments in England